The 2012–13 W-League grand final took place at AAMI Park in Melbourne, Australia on 27 January 
2013.
It was the final match in the W-League 2012–13 season, and was played between third-placed Melbourne Victory and fourth-placed Sydney FC. Sydney FC won the match 3–1 thanks to goals by Nicola Bolger, Samantha Kerr and Kyah Simon.

Match details

Match statistics

See also
W-League records and statistics

References

External links

W-League grand final
2012–13 W-League (Australia)
Soccer in Melbourne
A-League Women Grand Finals